Ingrid Katharina van Engelshoven (born 12 July 1966) is a Dutch politician who served as Minister of Education, Culture and Science in the Third Rutte cabinet from 26 October 2017 until 10 January 2022.

A member of Democrats 66 (D66) party, she was the party chairwoman from 12 May 2007 until 9 March 2013; before her election to the House of Representatives in 2017, she had been an alderwoman in The Hague, from 26 June 2014 to 16 February 2017. Van Engelshoven studied political science at Radboud University Nijmegen and law at Leiden University. On 26 October 2017, she was appointed as Minister for Education, Culture and Science in Mark Rutte's third cabinet, the first member of her party to hold the position.

Feminism

According to Van Engelshoven, there are too many "white men" working at colleges and universities in the Netherlands. She has claimed that this leads to "nasty incidents involving intimidation of female employees". She has qualified the decision of the TU Eindhoven to no longer accept men for new vacancies as "courageous". The Dutch Institute for Human Rights later ruled that this decision violates Dutch equality laws.

References

External links

Official
  Mr.Drs. I.K. (Ingrid) van Engelshoven Parlement & Politiek

 

1966 births
Living people
Aldermen of The Hague
Chairmen of the Democrats 66
Democrats 66 politicians
Dutch management consultants
Dutch political consultants
Dutch women jurists
Leiden University alumni
Members of the House of Representatives (Netherlands)
Ministers of Education of the Netherlands
People from Delfzijl
Radboud University Nijmegen alumni
Women government ministers of the Netherlands
20th-century Dutch civil servants
21st-century Dutch civil servants
21st-century Dutch women politicians
21st-century Dutch politicians
Dutch feminists
20th-century Dutch women